The European Journal of Contraception and Reproductive Health Care is a peer-reviewed medical journal that covers all areas of contraception and reproductive health. It is the official journal of the European Society of Contraception and Reproductive Health.

References

External links 
 
 European Society of Contraception and Reproductive Health

Publications established in 1996
Obstetrics and gynaecology journals
Taylor & Francis academic journals
Bimonthly journals
English-language journals
Academic journals associated with international learned and professional societies of Europe